= Health and History =

- Discipline: History of medicine
- Language: English
- Edited by: Hans Pols

Publication details
- History: 1998-present
- Publisher: Australian and New Zealand Society of the History of Medicine (Australia, New Zealand)
- Frequency: Biannually

Standard abbreviations
- ISO 4: Health Hist.

Indexing
- ISSN: 1442-1771
- LCCN: 2007-252088
- JSTOR: 14421771
- OCLC no.: 60617445

Links
- Journal homepage

Health and History is a peer-reviewed academic journal published biannually by the Australian and New Zealand Society of the History of Medicine and covering the history of medicine in Australia, New Zealand, and the Pacific. It was established in 1998 and is edited by Hans Pols (University of Sydney), Dr. Peter Hobbins (University of Sydney), and Dr. Susan Heydon (University of Otago).
